Pyrausta tyralis, the coffee-loving pyrausta moth, is a moth in the family Crambidae. It was described by Achille Guenée in 1854. It is found in the United States, where it has been recorded from New York to Illinois and from Florida to Arizona. It is also found from Mexico to Venezuela, as well as on the West Indies.

Adults have been recorded on wing year round.

The larvae feed on Psychotria nervosa, Psychotria undata, Bidens connata and Dahlia species.

References

Moths described in 1854
tyralis
Moths of North America